Guindy, is located in north west part of Chennai City.

Guindy may also refer to:
 Guindy taluk, is a taluk.
 Guindy National Park, is a lake.
 Guindy metro station, is a railway station.
 Guindy Engineering College,  is a College.
 Guindy railway station, is a railway station.
 Guindy division, is a revenue division.
 Guindy Links, is one of the three 18-hole golf courses in Chennai.